Balakrishnudu is a 2017 Indian Telugu-language romantic action film directed by debutant Mallela Pavan. It features Nara Rohit, Regina Cassandra and Ramya Krishna in the lead roles, while Adithya Menon, Ajay, Kota Srinivasa Rao, and Pruthviraj play supporting roles. The film is produced by B. Mahendra Babu, Musunuru Vamsi Krishna and Sri Vinod Nandamuri on Saraschandrikaa Visionary Motion Pictures and MayaBazar Movies. The music was composed by Mani Sharma with cinematography by Vijay C. Kumar and editing by Kotagiri Venkateswara Rao. The film released on 24 November 2017. It also marks the third collaboration between Nara Rohit and Mani Sharma after Baanam and Solo.

Plot
Balu (Nara Rohit) is a free-spirited young man whose highest priority in life is earning money. Being an orphan, he is raised by Raghunandan Yadav (Kota Srinivasa Rao), who is his godfather. Balu’s life ends up in trouble because of his lust for money.  His love life with Aadhya (Regina Cassandra) is also twisted because of that. in a power packed episode.

Cast

 Nara Rohit as Balakrishna aka Balu
 Regina Cassandra as Aadhya
 Ramya Krishna as Bhanumati Devi
 Adithya Menon as Ravinder Reddy
 Ajay as Pratap Reddy
 Kota Srinivasa Rao as Raghunandan Yadav
 Pruthviraj as Madhava Rao / Maddy R
 Raghu Karumanchi as Rowdy
 Vennela Kishore as Kishore
 Raghu Babu as Peddha Paleru
 Srinivasa Reddy as Chitti Babu
 Ravi Varma as Mastan
 Aathma Patrick as Bala
 Shravya Reddy as Padma
 Tejaswi Madivada
 Satya Krishnan
 Avantika Vandanapu as Young Aadhya
 Diksha Panth as cameo appearance
 Pia Bajpai in a special appearance
 Priyanka Singh (Jabardasth & Bigg Boss 5 fame)

Filming 
The filming began on 31 March 2017, a year after the script was given a green signal. Producers Nandamuri Sri Vinod and Musunuru Vamsi Krishna, who also happen to be director Mallela Pavan’s childhood friends, are producing the movie on their banner Saraschandrikaa Visionary Motion Pictures in collaboration with Maya Bazar Movies of B. Mahendra Babu. The major part of the movie was shot in different locations of Hyderabad while the songs were shot in Bergen and Oslo in Norway. With a total number of shoot days being 53, the film is in its post-production stage.

Soundtrack
The audio and background score were composed by Mani Sharma and released by Aditya Music. Samantha Ruth Prabhu released the audio in an event on 10 November 2017 .

References

External links
 

2017 films
2010s Telugu-language films
Films shot in Andhra Pradesh
Films scored by Mani Sharma
Indian romantic  action films
2017 action films